The LIU Sharks are the athletics teams representing Long Island University's (LIU) campuses in Brooklyn and Brookville, New York. The Sharks compete in NCAA Division I athletics and are members of the Northeast Conference. The LIU Sharks are the result of the July 1, 2019 unification of the athletic departments which had previously represented two separate campuses of LIU, the NCAA Division I LIU Brooklyn Blackbirds and the NCAA Division II LIU Post Pioneers.

History
Following Long Island University's founding in 1927, its sports teams wore blue uniforms and became known as the Blue Devils. After the school's uniforms were changed to black in 1935, a Brooklyn Eagle reporter from the Midwest saw the new look as the basketball team dribbled up and down the court and stated that the team looked like the blackbirds from back home; the comment struck home, and a new nickname was born. During the 1930s and '40s, the basketball team was often called the "Beemen," while they were coached by the legendary Naismith Basketball Hall of Fame coach, Clair Bee. LIU Post opened in 1954 as C.W. Post College and began athletic competition in 1956–57.

The LIU Brooklyn Blackbirds and LIU Post Pioneers combined for 23 national championships (7 team, 16 individual), 215 conference titles, and 362 All-Americans.

Unification

On October 3, 2018, Long Island University announced that it was unifying the athletic programs of its two campuses into one Division I program, effective with the 2019–20 academic year. The unified LIU program continues to sponsor all varsity sports that either campus sponsored before the merger. The new program's nickname of Sharks was announced on May 15, 2019.

The LIU Sharks inherited the athletic legacy of the Brooklyn campus, including its membership in the Northeast Conference. The Division II LIU Post teams for sports that had not been sponsored by LIU Brooklyn immediately moved to Division I without the usual transition period for an institution moving to a different division. Teams for sports sponsored by both campuses were merged. LIU added two completely new women's sports effective in 2019–20. Shortly before the athletic merger was announced, LIU Brooklyn announced that it would add women's ice hockey and shortly after the merger announcement, LIU announced it would add women's water polo, placing that sport in the Metro Atlantic Athletic Conference.

The university incorporated athletic facilities on both the Brooklyn and Brookville campuses with basketball, bowling, fencing, ice hockey, swimming, track and field (indoor & outdoor), volleyball, and water polo based out of the Brooklyn campus while baseball, cross country, esports, equestrian, field hockey, football, golf, lacrosse, rugby, soccer, softball, tennis, and wrestling operating from the Brookville campus.

Teams 
Long Island University fields 35 teams that compete in 14 men's and 20 women's sports and 1 co-ed e-sports team. Most teams compete in the Northeast Conference (NEC). Affiliations outside the Northeast Conference are as follows:

 Women's equestrian: Independent
 Esports: Eastern College Athletic Conference
 Women's fencing: Independent
 Women's gymnastics: East Atlantic Gymnastics League
 Men's ice hockey: Independent
 Women's ice hockey: New England Women's Hockey Alliance
 Men's lacrosse: Metro Atlantic Athletic Conference (from 2022–23)
 Women's rowing: TBD (2022–23)
 Women's rugby: National Intercollegiate Rugby Association
 Men's volleyball: Independent (2021–22 only, after which the NEC will begin sponsoring men's volleyball)
 Women's water polo: Metro Atlantic Athletic Conference
 Men's wrestling: Eastern Intercollegiate Wrestling Association

NCAA team championships
Men's Division II Lacrosse Championship – 1996, 2009, 2010
Women's Division II Lacrosse Championship – 2001, 2007, 2012, 2013
* Both competing as LIU Post Pioneers.

Footnotes

References

External links
 

 
 

Sports teams in the New York metropolitan area
Sports in Brooklyn